The yellowfin barbel (Luciobarbus xanthopterus) is a species of cyprinid fish endemic to the Tigris-Euphrates River System.

References 

Luciobarbus
Fish of Asia
Fish described in 1843
Taxa named by Johann Jakob Heckel